TM1 a.k.a. IBM Cognos TM1 is the former brand of IBM Planning Analytics (formerly Applix TM1, formerly Sinper TM/1) enterprise planning software.

TM1 may also refer to:

 Soyuz TM-1, an unmanned test flight of the Soyuz-TM spacecraft
 Convoy TM 1, the code name for an Allied convoy during the Second World War
 Thermal Monitoring 1, a computer central processing unit thermal control
 TM1, a Rolls-Royce Marine Olympus gas turbine

See also
 1969 TM1, an asteroid from the asteroid belt
 6291 Renzetti (1985 TM1), a main-belt asteroid
 5105 Westerhout (1986 TM1), a main-belt asteroid
 (9942) 1989 TM1, a main belt asteroid
 8660 Sano (1990 TM1), an outer main-belt asteroid
 (16592) 1992 TM1, a minor planet
 (65780) 1995 TM1, a main-belt minor planet